Albert Edward Jones (1878 - 1954) was an English silversmith and designer.

Jones trained at the Birmingham School of Art under Edward R. Taylor and was for a period a Guildsman of the Birmingham Guild of Handicraft. He founded A. E. Jones & Co. in 1902. Although best known for hallmarked silver, the firm also produced notable work in bronze, copper and brass.

References

English designers
English silversmiths
People from Birmingham, West Midlands
1878 births
1954 deaths
Alumni of the Birmingham School of Art